James Wani Igga (born 1949) is a South Sudanese who was the second vice president of South Sudan. He was speaker of the National Legislative Assembly from 2011 to 2013 and secretary general of the Sudan People's Liberation Movement. On 30 May 2020, he tested positive for COVID-19.

Early life
Igga was born in 1949. He is variously described to stem from the Bari and Zande ethnic groups and he is a Roman Catholic. He studied economics in Cairo.

Civil war years
Igga joined the South Sudanese rebels in 1985, training in Cuba and Ethiopia. He rose rapidly through the Sudan People's Liberation Army (SPLA) ranks, and, by 1987, had the rank of major and commanded the Shakus Battalion. The same year, he was Zonal Commander of Central Equatoria and a member of the SPLA High Command. He was reportedly well-respected among civilians.

Igga was one of the SPLA's most senior representatives during negotiations with SPLA-Nasir. He represented Garang as the head of the SPLA-Torit delegation at peace talks in Nairobi in November 1991. In 1993, he accompanied Garang to Nairobi for a peacemaking seminar in June and to Kampala for an IGAD-mediated dialogue with the Nasir faction. Igga had known Lam Akol, one of the Nasir leaders, since their time together in the Cuban training camp.

As chairman of the SPLM Political Affairs Commission, Igga established the Technical Committee of Intellectuals in February 2000. This committee was tasked with planning the civil administration of Southern Sudan.

Post-war politics
Following the 2005 signing of the Comprehensive Peace Agreement establishing the autonomy of Southern Sudan, Igga was in charge of changing the SPLM from an insurgent strategic leadership to a political party. He was chosen as the speaker of Southern Sudan Legislative Assembly in 2005, and he continued in that office until independence in 2011. In addition, he was appointed caretaker governor of Upper Nile State for the transitional period.

Igga read out the proclamation of independence when the two Sudans divided. He continued as the legislative speaker of the lower house from 2011 to 2013.

President Salva Kiir appointed Igga as vice president on 23 August 2013 to replace Riek Machar, who he had dismissed a month previously. He was required to resign as speaker. Igga was unanimously confirmed by the National Assembly on 26 August.

On 19 August 2020, six of Igga's bodyguards were killed in a road ambush by National Salvation Front rebels in Igga's home town of Lobonok. He was not with those bodyguards at the time.

References

1949 births
Living people
South Sudanese Roman Catholics
SPLM/SPLA Political-Military High Command
Sudan People's Liberation Movement politicians
Vice-presidents of South Sudan
Speakers of the National Legislative Assembly (South Sudan)
Members of the Southern Sudan Legislative Assembly
People from Central Equatoria
21st-century South Sudanese politicians